Longtancunella is a genus of problematic brachiopod from the Lower Cambrian Chengjiang Lagerstätte.  Its pedicle, which resembles the modern Chileates', is often preserved; the organisms often live in clusters of around a dozen attached to the same basal object (usually a shell or exoskeleton).

References

Prehistoric brachiopod genera
Cambrian genus extinctions